Cecilia Edith Rotenberg Gutkin better known as Cecilia Roth (born August 8, 1956) is an Argentine actress. She is the winner of two Goya Awards and a European Film Award. She is known for being an "Almodóvar girl" and the "muse" of Fito Páez during the 1990s.

Life and career

Roth's father, Abrasha Rotenberg, is of Ukrainian Jewish origin, having moved in the 1930s to Buenos Aires, where he worked as a writer, editor, and journalist. Cecilia's mother, Dina Gutkin, known as Dina Rot, a singer, was born in Mendoza and spent her childhood in Santiago de Chile. Her brother, Argentine musician Ariel Rot, is a former member of the Spanish-Argentine supergroup Los Rodríguez and lives in Spain.

She began as an actress in Argentina, until 1976 when she fled the military dictatorship and moved to Spain. Roth has had great success in Spanish film since her first appearances in Las verdes praderas (The Green Meadows), by José Luis Garci; Arrebato (Rapture), by Iván Zulueta; and Laberinto de pasiones (Labyrinth of Passion) by Pedro Almodóvar. Her most prominent movies include Un lugar en el mundo (A place in the world) and Martín (hache), both by Adolfo Aristarain. In 1980 she worked with Almodovar on "Pepi, Luci, Bom" and "All About My Mother", which earned Almodovar his first Academy Award for Best Foreign Language Film.

She is also known for her leading role in Todo sobre mi madre (All about my mother), by Almodóvar. Roth won Goya Awards for Best Actress with both directors. Roth has also made noteworthy appearances in numerous television series, including the soap operas Por amor (For love), together with Arnaldo André and Marita Ballesteros, and Nueve lunas (Nine moons). She appeared in the mini-series Laura y Zoe together with Susú Pecoraro, Epitafios (Epitaphs) with Julio Chávez and Leonardo Sbaraglia, and Tratame bien (Treat me nice) again with Chávez.

Roth was first married to Gonzalo Gil, then later married to Argentine singer-songwriter Fito Páez for some years, with whom she adopted a child, Martín. Joaquin Sabina composed the song "Cecilia" for Roth and Páez. In addition to her career in film and television, Roth has also worked in theater in Argentina, as well as in Spain. She is currently working, together with Darío Grandinetti, on the Philippe Blasband play, Una relación pornográfica.

Filmography
Some of the best-known works in which Roth has acted include:

Film and television

No toquen a la nena (1976)
Crecer de golpe (1977)
De fresa, limón y menta (1978)
Verdes praderas (1979)
La familia, bien, gracias (1979)
Reproches (1980)
El curso en que amamos a Kim Novak (1980)
Cuentos eróticos (1980)
Arrebato (1980)
Pepi, Luci, Bom y otras chicas del montón (1980)
Pepe, no me des tormento (1981)
Just a Film (Una película) (1981)
Trágala, perro (1981)
Best Seller (1982)
Laberinto de pasiones (1982)
Octubre, 12 (1982)
Historias paralelas (1983)
Entre tinieblas (1983)
Una pequeña movida (1983)
El señor Galíndez (1984)
¿Qué he hecho yo para merecer esto? (1984)
El jardín secreto (1984)
The Stranger (1987)
Los amores de Kafka (1988)
La dama del bosque (1989)
Vivir mata (1991)
Un lugar en el mundo (1992)
Desencuentros (1992)
La balada de Donna Helena (1994)
Caballos salvajes (1995)
Martín (Hache) (1997)
Cenizas del paraíso (1997)
Todo sobre mi madre (1999)
Segunda piel (2000)
Una noche con Sabrina Love (2000)
Afrodita, el sabor del amor (2001)
Antigua vida mía (2001)
Vidas privadas (2001)
Pernicioso vegetal (2002)
Hable con ella (2002)
Deseo (2002)
Kamchatka (2002)
La hija del caníbal (2003)
Epitafios (2004)
Luisa Sanfelice (2004)
Otros días vendrán (2005)
La intrusa (2005)
Amas de casa desesperadas (2006)
Sofacama (2006)
Las películas de mi padre (2007)
Epoxy (2007)
Resurrectores (2007)
Tratame bien (2009)
Epitafios 2: El final ahora tiene dos caras (2009)
I'm So Excited (2013)
El Angel (2018)
Pain and Glory (2019)
The Intruder (2020)
Crímenes de familia (2020)

Narration

Theater

Awards and nominations

Goya Awards

European Film Awards

Cóndor de Plata Awards

Fotograma de Plata Awards

Konex Awards

Other awards
 Gold Medal of Merit in the Fine Arts (2009)
 Festival de Cine Iberoamericano de Huelva (2000) for Best Actress in Una noche con Sabrina Love.
 Sant Jordi Award (1999) for Todo sobre mi madre .
 Latin ACE Award (1997) for Martín (Hache).

See also
Epitafios

References

External links

 
 

1956 births
Living people
European Film Award for Best Actress winners
Actresses from Buenos Aires
Jewish Argentine actresses
Best Actress Goya Award winners
20th-century Argentine actresses
21st-century Argentine actresses
Chicas Almodóvar